Mannar massacre may refer to:

Cankili I's massacre of Paravar Catholics on Mannar Island in 1544
1984 Mannar massacre, the killing of Tamils in Mannar town by the Sri Lankan Army
Vankalai massacre, the killing of a family of 4 Tamils in Vankalai, Mannar district, in 2006
Madhu school bus bombing, the killing of 17 people in Mannar town in 2008

See also
Mannar (disambiguation)